Travis A. Moore is an American attorney and politician. He is a member of the South Carolina House of Representatives from the 33rd District, serving since 2020. He is a member of the Republican party.

References

Living people
Republican Party members of the South Carolina House of Representatives
21st-century American politicians
The Citadel, The Military College of South Carolina alumni
University of South Carolina alumni
Year of birth missing (living people)